Menard may refer to:

Places

Canada
Menard River, a tributary of the Wawagosic River in Quebec, Canada

United States
 Menard County, Illinois
 Menard, Illinois
 Menard County, Texas
 Menard, Texas
 Menard–Hodges site, archaeological site in Arkansas
 Pierre Menard Home State Historic Site, historic park in Illinois
 Pierre Menard House, 1810 French Creole-style home of Pierre Menard

Organizations
 Menard Press, small press publisher founded in 1969
 Menard Independent School District, Menard, Texas
 Menard Correctional Center, a maximum and high-medium security prison in Illinois
 Team Menard, John Menard, Jr.'s Indy Racing League team
 Menard Art Museum, Komaki, Aichi, central Japan

Other uses
 Menard (surname)
 "Pierre Menard, Author of the Quixote", short story by Argentine writer Jorge Luis Borges
 Pierre Menard (fictional character), a fictional writer in the story

See also
 
 Menards, chain of home improvement stores in the Midwestern United States
 Ménard (disambiguation)